The Taeping was a clipper ship built in 1863 by Robert Steele & Company of Greenock and owned by Captain Alexander Rodger of Cellardyke, Fife. Taeping participated in The Great Tea Race of 1866 and narrowly defeated the Ariel. The ship's captain was Donald MacKinnon (Dòmhnall ’ic Nèill ’ic Dhòmnaill Ruaidh) of Heanish, Tiree. It was wrecked on 22 September 1871 by Ladd's Reef in the South China Sea while traveling to New York.

Sailing performance
According to Basil Lubbock, the tea clippers Taeping, Fiery Cross, Serica and Lahloo performed at their best in light breezes, as they were all rigged with single topsails.

References

Clippers
Individual sailing vessels
Tall ships of the United Kingdom
Ships built on the River Clyde
1863 ships
Maritime incidents in 1871